Iosco County Airport (IATA: ECA, FAA LID: 6D9) is a publicly owned, public use airport located 3 miles northeast of East Tawas, Michigan in Iosco County. The airport is on 276 acres at an elevation of 605.3 ft (184.5 m).

The airport is home to a flying club that offers aircraft rental and regular events for members. The club holds annual fly-ins that offer breakfast and aircraft displays.

History 
The airport was moved to its current location in 1962. The airport received federal funding until 1993, when the Wurtsmith Air Force Base closed.

The airport was home to a stop on the Wings of Mercy tour in 2022 to help raise funds to operate additional medical flights. Proceeds help make sure that patients can fly for free to places where they need medical treatment.

Facilities and aircraft 
The airport has one runway, designated as runway 8/26. It measures 4802 x 75 ft (1464 x 23 m) and is paved with asphalt. For the 12-month period ending December 31, 2019, the airport has 3224 aircraft operations per week, an average of 62 per week. All the traffic consists of general aviation. For the same period, there were 25 aircraft based on the field, all airplanes: 24 single-engine and 1 multi-engine.

The airport has a fixed-base operator that offers fuel and limited amenities.

Accidents and incidents 

 On August 13, 2008, a Piper PA-34 Seneca inadvertently landed gear-up at the airport. The pilot noted that he had failed to lower the landing gear during the before-landing checklist. The probable cause was found to be the pilot's failure to lower the landing gear prior to touchdown.

References 

Aviation in Michigan
Airports in Michigan
Transportation in Iosco County, Michigan
Buildings and structures in Iosco County, Michigan